is a former Japanese football player. He played for Japan national team.

Club career
Mori was born in Nagasaki Prefecture on July 12, 1961. After graduating from Fukuoka University, he joined Japan Soccer League Division 1 club Fujita Industries in 1984. The club was relegated to Division 2 in 1990. In 1992, the club won the champions in Division 2. He retired in 1992. He played 131 games and scored 19 goals in the league.

National team career
On June 2, 1988, Mori debuted for Japan national team against China. In 1989, he played at the 1990 World Cup qualification. He played 8 games for Japan until 1989.

Club statistics

National team statistics

References

External links

Japan National Football Team Database
 

1961 births
Living people
Fukuoka University alumni
Association football people from Nagasaki Prefecture
Japanese footballers
Japan international footballers
Japan Soccer League players
Japan Football League (1992–1998) players
Shonan Bellmare players
Association football midfielders
Japanese sportsperson-politicians